The 1967 Vanderbilt Commodores football team represented Vanderbilt University in the 1967 NCAA University Division football season. The Commodores were led by head coach Bill Pace in his first season and finished the season with a record of two wins, seven losses and one tie (2–7–1 overall, 0–5 in the SEC).

Schedule

Source: 1967 Vanderbilt football schedule

References

Vanderbilt
Vanderbilt Commodores football seasons
Vanderbilt Commodores football